Daughter of Serpents (retitled The Scroll on the CD version) is a 1992 point-and-click adventure game developed by Eldritch Games and published by Millennium Interactive for DOS. The game was released in the English, Italian, French, German and Spanish languages. It was planned to be ported to Amiga by December, but ultimately that was never released.

Plot
The game's plot is inspired by the Cthulhu Mythos. In Ancient Egypt, dark worshippers contained some evil spells inside an ancient scroll to unleash monsters upon the world. In Alexandria in the 1920s, the scroll is given to the player by a strange lady.

Gameplay
Before starting the game, the player can select one out six playable characters or customize one. A customized character can be either gender, with a profile inputted, one of two nationalities and a choice from six classes each with four or five skills. The character stats will determine what puzzles the player can solve in the game. The player's starting inventory consists of a diary, a map, some petty cash, a cookbook and a guidebook.

The CD version only allows two different playable characters to be chosen each with a different adventure in the game; Matthew Faulkner the Egyptologist and an Occultist. Unlike the Floppy version, the player must acquire the map, cookbook and guidebook rather than start with them.

Development
Keith Hook programmed the game engine SIGNOS (Scripted Interactive Graphic Novel Operating System).

The lead artist Pete Lyon visited Egypt before he worked on the graphics to implement realism in the game. Richard Edwards ensured that all graphics were accurate to the time period of the game. The hotel scene was based on a photograph of Savoy from 1920.

References

External links

1992 video games
Adventure games
Cancelled Amiga games
DOS games
DOS-only games
Point-and-click adventure games
Psygnosis games
Video games based on works by H. P. Lovecraft
Video games developed in the United Kingdom
Video games scored by Richard Joseph
Video games set in the 1920s
Video games set in Egypt